Tengku Maimun binti Tuan Mat (born 2 July 1959) is a Malaysian lawyer who has served as the 10th Chief Justice of Malaysia since May 2019. She is the first woman to ascend to the highest judicial office of the country.

Tengku Maimun was announced as Malaysia's new Chief Justice, succeeding Richard Malanjum who retired in April 2019, in a statement released by the Prime Minister's Department on 2 May 2019.

Education
Tengku Maimun graduated from the University of Malaya with a Bachelor of Laws (Honours) (LL.B.) in 1982.

Career
Tengku Maimun joined the judicial service in 1982 as a legal officer for the Southern Kelantan Development Board (KESEDAR) and later the Seremban Municipal Council.

After a career that included postings at the Attorney General's Chambers, Magistrates and Sessions Courts, Tengku Maimun was appointed as a judicial commissioner in 2006.

Between September 2007 and January 2013, Tengku Maimun served as a High Court judge. Her tenure included postings at the Kuala Lumpur High Court and later at Shah Alam High Court.

Prior to her appointment as a judge of the Federal Court of Malaysia, she was first elevated as a judge of the Court of Appeal of Malaysia. Tengku Maimun served in this position for almost six years, between January 2013 and November 2018.

In November 2018, Tengku Maimun was appointed as a Federal Court judge, the highest court of the country.

Following the ninth Chief Justice's, Richard Malanjum's, compulsory retirement at the age of 66 in April 2019, Tengku Maimun was announced as his successor in May 2019 after the Prime Minister of Malaysia, Mahathir Mohamad, confirmed having received the approval from the Yang di-Pertuan Agong (King of Malaysia). She became the first woman in history to hold the office of Chief Justice of Malaysia, creating another first for the holder of the top judicial office after Malanjum became the first person from the Borneo states of Malaysia to ascend to the office.

Notable cases
In 2013, Tengku Maimun, alongside two other Court of Appeal judges, unanimously reversed a decision by the High Court to convict two former Malaysian police commandos of murder of the Mongolian model Altantuya Shaariibuu. This decision was later reinstated by the Federal Court.

In 2014, Tengku Maimun was the only judge part of a three-person Court of Appeal panel presiding over a high profile child conversion case who dissented to the decision to reverse a mandamus order from the Ipoh High Court to then Inspector-General of Police (IGP), Khalid Abu Bakar, to locate and return M. Indira Gandhi's daughter Prasana Diksa and arrest her ex-husband Mohd Ridzuan. This decision was later overturned by the Federal Court.

In 2016, Tengku Maimun was the sole judge part of a three-person Court of Appeal panel to dissent to the decision to convict then Democratic Action Party (DAP) chairman Karpal Singh of sedition. After three years, the late politician was unanimously acquitted by a seven-person Federal Court panel.

In 2018, a three-person Court of Appeal panel led by Tengku Maimun upheld the decision by the High Court which found Southeast Asia's largest publicly-listed power company Tenaga Nasional guilty of negligence which led to the flash floods at Cameron Highlands in 2013. This was following a lawsuit filed by 100 affected residents from Bertam Valley against the company. She ruled that there was evidence that the company failed to properly maintain the dam at Ringlet. 

Tengku Maimun was part of a seven-person Federal Court panel chaired by then Chief Justice, Richard Malanjum, to set aside the stay of proceedings granted by the Court of Appeal in the trial of former Prime Minister Najib Razak. This enabled the trial over the global 1Malaysia Development Berhad scandal to finally begin after multiple delays.

On 16 March 2022, a five-member Federal Court bench led by Tengku Maimun has unanimously dismissed former prime minister Najib Razak's appeal to adduce more evidence to the SRC International Sdn Bhd graft case in a bid to overturn his conviction and sentence.

Honours
  :
  Commander of the Order of the Defender of the Realm (PMN) – Tan Sri (2019)
  Grand Commander of the Order of Loyalty to the Crown of Malaysia (SSM) – Tun (2020)
  :
  Knight Commander of the Order of the Loyalty to the Crown of Kelantan (DPSK) – Dato' (2006)
  Knight Grand Commander of the Order of the Loyalty to the Crown of Kelantan (SPSK) – Dato' (2016)
  :
  Knight Commander of the Order of the Defender of State (DUPN) – Dato' Seri Utama (2019)

See also
 Murder of Shaariibuugiin Altantuyaa
 2013 Cameron Highlands mud floods
 1Malaysia Development Berhad scandal

References

External links 

 Chief Justice

1959 births
Living people
20th-century women lawyers
21st-century women judges
21st-century women lawyers
Chief justices of Malaysia
Commanders of the Order of the Defender of the Realm
Grand Commanders of the Order of Loyalty to the Crown of Malaysia
20th-century Malaysian lawyers
21st-century Malaysian judges
Malaysian Muslims
Malaysian people of Malay descent
Malaysian women lawyers
People from Kelantan
People from Kota Bharu
University of Malaya alumni
Women chief justices
Women judges